Nokia 800 may refer to:

 Nokia Lumia 800, a Windows Phone 7-powered smartphone
 Nokia 800 Tough, a Kai OS-powered phone
 Nokia N800, an Internet tablet